Appias indra, the plain puffin, is a small butterfly of the family Pieridae, that is, the yellows and whites, which is found in south and southeast Asia.

Description

Food plants
Drypetes oblongifolia and Putranjiva roxburghii, both from the plant family Putranjivaceae.

See also
Pieridae
List of butterflies of India
List of butterflies of India (Pieridae)

Notes

References
 
 
 
 
 

Appias (butterfly)
Butterflies of Asia
Butterflies of Singapore
Butterflies of Indochina
Butterflies described in 1857